The 1996 Dr Martens Mosconi Cup, the third edition of the annual nine-ball pool competition between teams representing Europe and the United States, took place 19–22 December 1996 at the Goresbrook Leisure Centre in Dagenham, London, England.

Team USA won the Mosconi Cup by defeating Team Europe 15–13.


Teams

Results

Thursday, 19 December

Session 1

Session 2

Friday, 20 December

Session 3

Session 4

Saturday, 21 December

Session 5

Session 6

Sunday, 22 December

Session 7

Session 8

References

External links
 Official homepage

1996
1996 in cue sports
1996 sports events in London
Sport in the London Borough of Barking and Dagenham
1996 in English sport
December 1996 sports events in the United Kingdom